Irai may refer to:

 Irai, Orne, France
 Irai Dam, India
 Irai Island, Papua New Guinea
 Iraí, Brazil
 Iraí de Minas, Brazil
 Irai (web series), a 2022 Indian web series